Leaf Hall is a grade II listed former working men's institute in Eastbourne, East Sussex. It was built in 1863–64 to a design by Robert Knott Blessley in a continental gothic style for the philanthropist William Leaf. It was closely associated with the temperance movement. The building now serves as a community arts centre.

The foundation stone stated the building's purpose was "to promote the social, moral and spiritual welfare of the working classes of Eastbourne". The hall's facilities included a coffee room, lending library and reading room, smoking room, skittle yard and a lecture room capable of seating 200 people. In the absence of a local theatre the hall was used for staging visiting shows, including General Tom Thumb in 1865.

See also 
Listed buildings in Eastbourne

References

External links 

http://www.leafhall.co.uk/

Grade II listed buildings in East Sussex
Eastbourne
Buildings and structures completed in 1864
Working men's clubs
Temperance movement